Aripalam is a village situated in Thrissur district, Kerala, India. A very nearest towns are Irinjalakuda and  Kodungallore.
Main highlight of the village is it is a place between two main roads they are Thrissur - Kodungallur SH22 and Panvel - Edappally Road to connecting NH17 - NH47.

History

In the last decade of the 18th Century the last Naduvazhi Nambiar of Mukundapuram Nadu died and Sakthan Thampuran, the Ruler of Kochi formed Mukundapuram taluk by adding Mapranam nadu and Nandilathu nadu to Mukundapuram nadu (Muriya nadu). Sakthan Thampuran divided old Mukundapuram nadu into three properties viz.1) Aripalam  2)Thazhekkad, 3)Mukundapuram  and formed old Mapranam nadu into a single Mapranam Proverty(Kattungachira, Karalam, Porathussery & Madayikkonam) for administrative and revenue purposes .
Before the arrival of Tipu Sulthan to Mukundapuram nadu in December 1789 the headquarters of Padruado Archbishops of Cranganore(Kodungallur)of Syro-Malabar Christians (Nazranis) was at Aripalam (Pookkott) of Mukkundapuram Nadu. 
A certain group of people with Portuguese ancestry, named Anglo-Indians lives here.
A number of factors fostered a strong sense of community among Anglo-Indians.
Their cuisine, dress, speech, Anglo-centric culture,  etc. segregate them from the native population.

Religion 
Christians and Hindus live in Aripalam.

Transportation

Road 

Aripalam is located near major two cities: Thrissur is approximately 30 km and Ernakulam approximately 45 km from the village, and provide links to major national highways NH 47 and NH 17 in the State. Two main roads are nearby: State Highway 22 (Kerala) (Kodungallur-Shornur)onlyconnects via a 3 km road and State Highway 61 (Kerala) (Potta-Moonupeedika) is 6 km distance.

Railways 

The nearest railway station is the Irinjalakuda Railway Station which is about 15 km East of the town at Kallettumkara. Irinjalakuda Railway Station is managed by the Southern Railways of Indian Railways.

Air 

The nearest airport is the Cochin International Airport at Nedumbassery, which is 42 km away. The airport is well connected to all major airports in India and also connected to many foreign cities. Direct flights are available to Chennai, New Delhi, Mumbai, Bangalore and Kolkata.

References

 

Villages in Thrissur district